Javonte Dedrick Smart (born June 3, 1999) is an American professional basketball player for the Birmingham Squadron of the NBA G League. He played college basketball for the LSU Tigers.

High school career
Smart attended Scotlandville Magnet High School in Baton Rouge, Louisiana and led the school to a state title as a freshman, earning MVP honors. As a sophomore, he averaged 22.4 points, 7.2 assists, and 6.9 rebounds per game. He participated in the Under Armour Elite 24 Showcase in August 2016. As a junior, Smart averaged 25.1 points, 8.7 rebounds, 6.4 assists and 2.1 steals per game. He was named Gatorade Louisiana Player of the Year for the second consecutive season and led Scotlandville to a state title in 2017. As a senior, Smart averaged 32.9 points, 10.6 rebounds, and 6.1 assists per game, sometimes playing the center position. He led the team to a state title and was again named Player of the Year. Smart was considered a five-star recruit and was ranked 21st in his class according to 247Sports. Smart committed to LSU over offers from Kentucky and UCLA.

College career
On February 23, 2019, Smart scored a career-high 29 points and hit two free throws with 0.6 seconds remaining in a 82–80 win against Tennessee. Smart missed one game during his freshman season, the regular season finale against Vanderbilt on March 7, after a report surfaced alleging coach Will Wade paid him during his recruitment. He returned for the SEC and NCAA Tournaments after officials found no wrongdoing on Smart's part. As a freshman, Smart averaged 11.1 points, 3.3 rebounds, and 2.4 assists per game. After the season, he declared for the 2019 NBA draft but ultimately decided to return to LSU. As a sophomore, Smart averaged 12.5 points, 4.2 assists, 3.5 rebounds and 1.1 steals per game. Following the season Smart declared for the 2020 NBA draft but maintained his eligibility. Smart announced on August 3 that he was withdrawing from the draft and returning to LSU. As a junior, Smart averaged 16 points, 3.7 rebounds, four assists and 1.3 steals per game, earning Second Team All-SEC honors. He declared for the 2021 NBA draft and hired an agent.

Professional career

Sioux Falls Skyforce (2021)
After going undrafted in the 2021 NBA Draft, Smart joined the Miami Heat for the 2021 NBA Summer League and on September 10, he signed a contract with the Heat. He was waived prior to the start of the season and joined the Sioux Falls Skyforce as an affiliate player.

Milwaukee Bucks (2021–2022)
On November 30, 2021, Smart signed a two-way contract with the Milwaukee Bucks. Under the terms of the deal, he split time between the Bucks and their NBA G League affiliate, the Wisconsin Herd. On January 13, 2022, he was waived by the Bucks.

Return to Sioux Falls (2022)
On January 16, 2022, the Sioux Falls Skyforce reacquired Smart.

Miami Heat (2022)
On February 15, 2022, Smart signed a two-way contract with the Miami Heat. The same day, he scored 40 points in a win against the Rio Grande Valley Vipers. On July 16, Smart was waived by the Heat.

Birmingham Squadron (2022–present)
On November 4, 2022, Smart was named to the opening night roster for the Birmingham Squadron.

National team career
Smart has represented the United States in FIBA play on two occasions. In 2015, he was a member of the gold medal-winning US team in the 2015 FIBA Americas Under-16 Championship and averaged 6.8 points, 4.2 rebounds, 1.4 assists, and 1.9 steals per game. Smart then won a gold medal at the 2016 FIBA Under-17 World Championship in Zaragoza, Spain.
 
In the U17 tournament, Smart averaged 5.4 points, 3.4 assists and 3 rebounds per game.

Career statistics

NBA

|-
| style="text-align:left;"| 
| style="text-align:left;"| Milwaukee
| 13 || 1 || 12.3 || .256 || .222 || .833 || 1.5 || 1.1 || .3 || .2 || 2.4
|-
| style="text-align:left;"| 
| style="text-align:left;"| Miami
| 4 || 0 || 10.0 || .471 || .444 || — || 1.3 || .5 || .5 || .3 || 5.0
|- class="sortbottom"
| style="text-align:center;" colspan="2"| Career
| 17 || 1 || 11.8 || .317 || .296 || .833 || 1.4 || .9 || .4 || .2 || 3.0

College

|-
| style="text-align:left;"| 2018–19
| style="text-align:left;"| LSU
| 34 || 18 || 29.9 || .368 || .311 || .839 || 3.3 || 2.4 || 1.3 || .1 || 11.1
|-
| style="text-align:left;"| 2019–20
| style="text-align:left;"| LSU
| 31 || 30 || 34.2 || .415 || .326 || .814 || 3.5 || 4.2 || 1.1 || .2 || 12.5
|-
| style="text-align:left;"| 2020–21
| style="text-align:left;"| LSU
| 28 || 28 || 35.6 || .460 || .402 || .857 || 3.7 || 4.0 || 1.3 || .1 || 16.0
|- class="sortbottom"
| style="text-align:center;" colspan="2"| Career
| 93 || 76 || 33.1 || .414 || .351 || .836 || 3.5 || 3.5 || 1.2 || .1 || 13.0

Personal life
Smart is the son of Melinda Smart and Jerry Matthews. He has an older sister, Desiree, and a younger brother, Davyion. His cousin, Keith Smart has played and coached in the NBA.

References

External links
LSU Tigers bio
USA Basketball bio

1999 births
Living people
American men's basketball players
Basketball players from Baton Rouge, Louisiana
LSU Tigers basketball players
Miami Heat players
Milwaukee Bucks players
Point guards
Sioux Falls Skyforce players
Undrafted National Basketball Association players